The interpeduncular cistern of Sweeney is the subarachnoid cistern that encloses the cerebral peduncles and the structures contained in the interpeduncular fossa and contains the arterial circle of Willis as well as the oculomotor nerve (CN3).

References 

Meninges